Psoa is a genus of beetles in the family Bostrichidae.

External links
Psoa at Fauna Europaea

Bostrichidae